Pierre Berton, (6 March 1842 – 23 October 1912) was a French actor and playwright.

Biographie 
Pierre Berton, real name Pierre François Samuel Montan, was the grandson of the composer Henri Montan Berton (1767-1844), the son of the actor Charles-François Montan Berton, called Francisque Berton (1820-1874) and of Caroline Samson, novelist and Joseph Samson's daughter, himself a sociétaire de la Comédie française.

Pierre Berton first appeared as an actor on the Parisian stages, winning success at the théâtre du Gymnase, the Théâtre de l'Odéon, the Théâtre-Français, and the Théâtre du Vaudeville. In 1865, he made his debut as playwright with Les Jurons de Cadillac, a one-act comedy, and carried on two years later with another comedy, La Vertu de ma femme. During three decades he would alternate his work as an author and an actor. At the end of the 19th century, he stopped performing but continued to write for theatre until his death.

Actor 
 1864: Les Flibustiers de la Sonore by Gustave Aimard and Amédée Rolland, Théâtre de la Porte-Saint-Martin
 1869: Patrie ! by Victorien Sardou, Théâtre de la Porte-Saint-Martin 
 1882: Fédora by Sardou,  Théâtre du Vaudeville
 1886: Le Crocodile by Sardou, Théâtre de la Porte-Saint-Martin 
 1887: La Tosca by Sardou, Théâtre de la Porte Saint Martin 
 1891: L'Impératrice Faustine by Stanislas Rzewuski, Théâtre de la Porte-Saint-Martin
 1895: Le Collier de la reine by Pierre Decourcelle, Théâtre de la Porte-Saint-Martin

Playwright 
 March 1862: Le Pavé by George Sand, with Pierre Chéri Lafont  (1797-1873); Pierre Berton (1842-1912); Marie Delaporte (1838-1910); Anna Chéri-Lesueur (1826-1912) as actors and actresses.
 1865: Les Jurons de Cadillac, comedy in 1 act, Théâtre du Gymnase
 1867: La Vertu de ma femme, comedy in 1 act, Théâtre du Gymnase
 1868: Didier, play in 3 acts, Théâtre de l'Odéon
 1880: La Tempête, symphonic poem in 3 parts, after Shakespeare, poem by Armand Silvestre and Pierre Berton, music by Alphonse Duvernoy, Théâtre du Châtelet
 1882: Sardanapalus, opera in 3 acts, after Lord Byron, libretto Pierre Berton, music by Alphonse Duvernoy, Concerts Lamoureux
 1889: Léna, play in 4 acts with Sarah Bernhardt, Théâtre des Variétés
 1894: Les Chouans, drama in 5 acts by Pierre Berton and Émile Blavet after Balzac, Théâtre de l'Ambigu
It was adapted in the United States by David Belasco, premiering in Washington, D.C. in 1898, and then moving to New York City in 1899
 1901: Yvette, comedy in 3 acts after Guy de Maupassant, Théâtre du Vaudeville
 1905: La Belle Marseillaise, drama in 4 acts, Théâtre de l'Ambigu
 1909: La Rencontre, play in 4 acts, Comédie-Française, 17 June 
 1912: Mioche, play in 3 acts, Théâtre du Vaudeville

Publication 
 Pierre Berton, Souvenirs de la vie de théâtre, La Revue de Paris, Paris, 1913

References

Bibliography 

External links 
Pierre Berton on BnF

19th-century French dramatists and playwrights
20th-century French dramatists and playwrights
19th-century French male actors
French male stage actors
Writers from Paris
1842 births
1912 deaths
Burials at Montmartre Cemetery